Paracraga pulverina is a moth in the family Dalceridae. It was described by Schaus in 1920. It is found in Guatemala.

References

Moths described in 1920
Dalceridae